Ninety from the Nineties: A Decade of Printing was an exhibition held at the New York Public Library from November 7, 2003 through May 28, 2004.

Ninety from the Nineties showcased a selection of ninety books made in the 1990s that were chosen on the merit of book arts. Note that the books were not necessarily written in the 1990s; some were older texts that were used to make special books in the 1990s. And, the books were not selected on literary merit.

In a contemporary review, The New York Times described the concept of the selection like this: "books, which we are accustomed to thinking of as containers — and conveyers — of information, are placed in a context in which form is valued over content. Language is less important than the type that impresses it on the page. The paper counts for more than the story told on it. The illustrations and the binding might be the story."

The books were divided into five categories: binding, paper, type, illustration and "inspiration." The exhibition was curated by Virginia Bartow.

Books in the exhibition

Following is a list of the ninety books selected and shown in the exhibition. The source for this list is the exhibition catalogue.

References
 Books as Art Objects (Reading Is Optional). Michael Frank, The New York Times, January 2, 2004. 
 Ninety from the Nineties: A Decade of Printing. (Catalogue of the exhibition at The New York Public Library.) Text by Virginia Bartow, curator, 2003.

See also
 Artist's book
 Letterpress printing
 Printing press
 Typography

External links
 Books as Art Objects (Reading Is Optional). Michael Frank, The New York Times, January 2, 2004. 
 Ninety from the Nineties Showcases a Decade of The New York Public Library's Contemporary Rare Books Acquisitions, www.nypl.org 

Book publishing in the United States
Paper art
Book design